Josef Novák (born 29 July 1956) is a retired football defender.

During his club career, Novák played solely for Dukla Prague. He also amassed 12 caps for the Czech national team, scoring 2 goals.

External links

 

1956 births
Living people
Czech footballers
Czechoslovak footballers
Czechoslovakia international footballers
Association football defenders
Dukla Prague footballers